Jimmy Lee Youngblood (born February 23, 1950) is a former American football linebacker in the National Football League (NFL) for the Los Angeles Rams and Washington Redskins. He played college football at Tennessee Tech and was drafted in the second round of the 1973 NFL Draft.

Early life
Youngblood was born in Union, South Carolina. He attended Jonesville High School in Jonesville, South Carolina, where he was all-conference in football, basketball, and baseball.

College career
Youngblood attended Tennessee Technological University from 1969–72, and set a school record with 476 tackles.  The Ohio Valley Conference named him Defensive Player of the Year in 1971 and 1972. He was selected by the Associated Press as a first-team linebacker on the 1972 Little All-America college football team.

Professional career
Youngblood played in the NFL for twelve seasons. He became the Rams' starting left-side linebacker during the 1976 season. Youngblood was part of one of the steadiest linebacking corps in the NFL, with Jack Reynolds in the middle and Isiah Robertson and Bob Brudzinski patrolling the right side. Youngblood had a nose for the football, recording 14 career interceptions and returning four touchdowns, two in the 1979 season.

Personal life
Youngblood's father was a standout semi-pro baseball player, and his mother was a star basketball player in high school in Jonesville. Contrary to common belief he is not related to former teammate and Pro Football Hall of Fame member Jack Youngblood.  However, since both Youngbloods had first names beginning with the same letter, the Rams had to include the entire names of both players on the back of their jerseys. Since their last names were so long, neither Jack nor Jim's first names could fit in the same line as their surnames, so the Rams simply put their first names above their last names when they ordered the jerseys.

References

External links
 
 
 World News Inc.: Jim Youngblood
 databasefootball.com: Jim Youngblood

1950 births
Living people
American football linebackers
Los Angeles Rams players
Washington Redskins players
National Conference Pro Bowl players
Tennessee Tech Golden Eagles football players
College Football Hall of Fame inductees
All-American college football players
People from Union, South Carolina